Rhadinaea taeniata is a species of snake in the family Colubridae. It is found in Mexico.

References 

Reptiles described in 1863
Taxa named by Wilhelm Peters
Colubrids
Reptiles of Mexico